Doppelganger (also known as Doppelganger: The Evil Within) is a 1993 American supernatural horror thriller film written and directed by Avi Nesher, starring Drew Barrymore and George Newbern. The film premiered at the Avoriaz Fantastic Film Festival in January 1993, where it was nominated for the "Grand Prize" award. It was released on VHS on May 26, 1993 in the United States. The film was George Maharis's last role.

Plot
The story follows Holly Gooding (Drew Barrymore), who moves from New York City to Los Angeles after being implicated in a murder. She is followed by what is apparently her evil twin. While in Los Angeles, she finds a room for rent by a writer named Patrick Highsmith (George Newbern). After some strange occurrences, it becomes less and less clear whether the woman is in fact Holly or her doppelgänger.

Patrick soon starts to realize something is odd about Holly. As he spends more and more time with her, things heat up and he falls for her. He then finds out that Holly's brother, Fred, is in a psychiatric hospital after killing his own father. When Patrick finds out that Holly's mother was murdered and she is the prime suspect, he starts doubting her sanity. But by that time he is too attached to her and does not want her going to jail. So when her brother Fred is attacked and she once more is a suspect he decides he is going to get to the bottom of it, no matter what.

At the end it is revealed that Holly has a split personality and absorbed a vanishing twin as a fetus in the womb. Also, it is her psychiatrist, Dr. Heller, that is responsible for all of Holly's misfortunes, having convinced Holly's alternate personality to murder her mother (who was planning to kill Holly for her money), and also having used a variety of disguises and latex masks to impersonate Holly and numerous other figures in Patrick's investigation in order to gaslight Holly as well as frame her for additional murders. Just as Dr. Heller is about to kill Patrick, Holly undergoes a bizarre supernatural transformation in which she splits into two partially unformed beings, one of which knocks the other one unconscious and kills Dr. Heller. The creature looks like it's about to kill Patrick, but spares him and remerges with the other creature to reform into Holly. The film ends with both Patrick and Holly recovering in the hospital.

Cast
Drew Barrymore as Holly Gooding
George Newbern as Patrick Highsmith
Dennis Christopher as Dr. Heller
Leslie Hope as Elizabeth
Sally Kellerman as Sister Jan
George Maharis as Mike Wallace
Peter Dobson as Rob
Carl Bressler as Larry Spaulding
Dan Shor as Stanley White
Jaid Barrymore as Mrs. Gooding
Stanley DeSantis as Richard Wolf
Thomas Bosack as Holly's Father
Sarina C. Grant as Detective Pouget
Scott Lawrence as Male Nurse
Danny Trejo as Hard Hat
Luana Anders as Ginger
Lillian Garrett-Groag as Additional Voices
Tina Lifford as Additional Voices
Sara Hickman as Psychiatrist #2
Sean Whalen as Gas Man

References

External links
 
 
 

1993 films
1993 horror films
1990s psychological thriller films
ITC Entertainment films
American supernatural horror films
American psychological horror films
American psychological thriller films
American supernatural thriller films
Films directed by Avi Nesher
Films scored by Jan A. P. Kaczmarek
1990s English-language films
1990s American films